A list of fellows of the Royal Society elected in 1970.

Fellows 

Cyril Clifford Addison
Frank Featherstone Bonsall
Colin Gasking Butler
Raymond Casey
Sir Cyril Astley Clarke
John Flavell Coales
Leonard Francis La Cour
Alexander Edgar Douglas
Colin Eaborn
Ian Michael Glynn
Sir Francis Graham-Smith
John Heslop-Harrison
John Malcolm Hirst
Vernon Martin Ingram
John Conrad Jaeger
John Leonard Jinks
Brian David Josephson
Oleg Alexander Kerensky
Norman Bertram Marshall
Mambillikalathil Govind Kumar Menon
Ricardo Miledi
Jacques Francis Albert Pierre Miller
Stanley Miles Partridge
Sir John Shipley Rowlinson
Sir Archibald Edward Russell
Robert William Stewart
John Bryan Taylor
David Arthur John Tyrrell
Eric John Underwood
John Paul Wild
Charles Gorrie Wynne
Vero Copner Wynne-Edwards

Foreign members

Hendrik Brugt Gerhard Casimir
Joachim August Wilhelm Hammerling
Arthur Kornberg
Eugene Paul Wigner

Statute 12 
Hugh Algernon Percy, 10th Duke of Northumberland

References

1970
1970 in science
1970 in the United Kingdom